The Albany James H. Gray Sr. Civic Center (Albany Civic Center for short) is a 10,240-seat multi-purpose arena in Albany, Georgia, United States.

History
With the opening of the Albany Mall in 1976, most long-established firms closed their stores in downtown Albany. Mayor James H. Gray Sr. led an effort to revitalize the downtown area by constructing a 10,240-seat civic center. The arena was named in honor of Gray after his sudden death in 1986.

The Albany Civic Center was also designed to be an arena and a convention center; as a result the arena features  of exhibit space plus an additional  of meeting room space.  As a rodeo arena it can seat 7,782; for Disney on Ice the arena can seat 6,570; as a basketball arena the center holds 8,436; for Sesame Street Live the arena seats 9,082; and for boxing and wrestling the arena seats 9,013.  For concerts the arena seats 5,728 in a half-house configuration, 10,297 end-stage and 10,711 for a center-stage show.  Up to 1,932 seats can be accommodated on the arena floor; there are only 905 retractable seats in addition to 7,794 permanent seats.

The arena is a part of the Flint River Entertainment Complex, a group of entertainment venues located in downtown Albany that also includes the Albany Municipal Auditorium and the Veterans Park Amphitheater.

Featured events
The Albany Civic Center was the home arena for the Georgia Firebirds indoor football team, last playing in the National Arena League in 2017.

From 1987 to 1992, the Albany Civic Center hosted The SEC women's basketball tournament.

Run-DMC music video for the song, "Mary, Mary", was filmed at the Albany Civic Center in 1988.

The Albany Civic Center hosted several professional wrestling events. This included National Wrestling Alliance's Clash of the Champions III: Fall Brawl (which aired live September 7, 1988, on TBS). It hosted World Championship Wrestling's pay-per-views Great American Bash (1992) and SuperBrawl IV, in addition to three episodes of WCW Monday Nitro on TNT (October 16, 1995, April 22, 1996 and April 29, 1996).

The Albany Civic Center is also the former home arena of the Albany Panthers indoor football team from 2010 to 2013, last playing in the Professional Indoor Football League, the South Georgia Wildcats of the now defunct af2 indoor football league, the Albany Shockwave of the American Basketball Association, Albany State University Golden Rams basketball (after the Flood of '94) and the Albany Sharp Shooters/South GA Blues of the defunct Global Basketball Association.

References

External links
 Official website

Basketball venues in Georgia (U.S. state)
Buildings and structures in Albany, Georgia
Convention centers in Georgia (U.S. state)
Indoor arenas in Georgia (U.S. state)
Sports venues in Georgia (U.S. state)
Tourist attractions in Albany, Georgia
Sports in Albany, Georgia